Nogometni klub Rogaška, commonly referred to as NK Rogaška or simply Rogaška, is a Slovenian football club which plays in the town of Rogaška Slatina. As of the 2022–23 season, they competes in the Slovenian Second League, the second-tier league of Slovenian football. Rogaška was established in 1999 after the dissolution of NK Steklar, which folded a few months earlier.

Honours
Slovenian Third League
 Winners: 2020–21

Slovenian Fourth Division
 Winners: 2015–16

Slovenian Fifth Division
 Winners: 2013–14

League history

References

External links
Official website 

Association football clubs established in 1999
Football clubs in Slovenia
1999 establishments in Slovenia